Ramón Quián (died May 26, 2006), better known as Monguito "El Único", was a Cuban vocalist, bandleader, producer and composer. An Afro-Cuban sonero, he had a simple improvising style with a distinctive nasal voice.

Career 
Monguito performed with Orquesta Mazzuet in his native town before relocating to Havana, where he sang with Orquesta Modernista and Conjunto Modelo. In the 1950s, Monguito el Único moved to Mexico. There he worked with Pepe Arévalo y Sus Mulatos and appeared in three movies. In 1962, Monguito moved to New York City, and began singing with Orquesta Broadway. He made his first recording, the album Primitivo, with Arsenio Rodríguez in 1963 for the Roost Records label. Monguito el Único was a member of Johnny Pacheco's conjunto in the mid-1960s, alternating lead vocals with the Puerto Rican singer Chivirico Dávila. In 1967, he made his Fania solo debut with Johnny Pacheco Presents Monguito. His debut on SAR Records, produced by Roberto Torres, was the album Yo no soy mentiroso in 1979. This recording went gold.

Much like Ismael Rivera, Monguito el Único embodies an earthy, pragmatic aesthetic in the tradition of the son montuno, forged in the streets of Cuba.

He was also uncle to Laurita Rodriguez, a prominent defense attorney in New York City.

Discography

  Pacheco te invita a bailar (with Johnny Pacheco) (1965)
  Bajándote (with Orchestra Harlow)  (1966)
  Viva África (with Johnny Pacheco) (1966)
  Latin Mann (with Herbie Mann) (1966)
  Pacheco Presents Monguito (with Johnny Pacheco) (1967)
  Fania All-Stars - Live at the Red Garter - Vol. 1  (1968)
  El Único  (1968)
  De Todo Un Poco  (1969)
  Escúchame (Listen To Me) (1971)
  Yo No Soy Mentiroso (1979)
  Sabrosura (with Johnny Pacheco) (1980)
  La Crema (with Johnny Pacheco) (1980)
  In Curacao (1980)
  Monguito El Internacional (1982)
  Monguito "Miren Que Suerte" SAR (1982)
  "Soy La Meta" "Caiman" (1994)
  "Sazonando" Monguito SAR (1985)

References

External links 
 Profile of Monguito, descarga.com.
Monguito "El Único", Rate Your Music.
YouTube video of Monguito and his band

Cuban male singers
Salsa musicians
Maracas players
2006 deaths
People from Matanzas Province
Year of birth missing